Merrick Island is an island in Barnstable County, Massachusetts. Great Beach Hill is located south-southwest of Merrick Island.

References

Islands of Massachusetts
Islands of Barnstable County, Massachusetts